Petrus is a 1946 French comedy film starring Fernandel and directed by Marc Allegret.

The film had admissions in France of 2,602,669.

Cast
Fernandel
Simone Simon

References

External links

Petrus at BFI
Petrus at Letterbox DVD

1946 films
1946 comedy films
French black-and-white films
French comedy films
1940s French-language films
1940s French films